The imperial election of 1376 was an imperial election held to select the emperor of the Holy Roman Empire.  It took place in Frankfurt on 10 June.

Background 
This was the first imperial election following the enactment of the Golden Bull of 1356, which laid out in exact terms the qualifications of the electors and the manner of holding elections.  Charles IV, Holy Roman Emperor called for the election of his son Wenceslaus IV of Bohemia.  The former, as king of Bohemia, and the latter, as margrave of Brandenburg, were entitled to two of the seven votes.  The remaining prince-electors were:

 Louis of Meissen, elector of Mainz
 Kuno II von Falkenstein, elector of Trier
 Frederick III of Saarwerden, elector of Cologne
 Rupert I, Elector Palatine, elector of the Electoral Palatinate
 Wenceslaus I, Duke of Saxe-Wittenberg, elector of Saxony

Elected 
Wenceslaus IV was duly elected.  He succeeded his father as Holy Roman Emperor and king of Bohemia on the latter's death on November 29, 1378.

References 

1376
1376 in the Holy Roman Empire
14th-century elections
Non-partisan elections
Charles IV, Holy Roman Emperor